François Gommers (5 April 1917; Antwerp, Belgium – 20 April 1996) was a Belgian footballer. He was a defender for Beerschot VAC with whom he was twice Belgian Champion in 1938 and 1939.

He was also a Belgium international in 1938, playing in two friendly matches. He finished his career in 1946, at Standard de Liège, and then rejoined his first club, where he coached the first team, from 1952–1953.

Honours
International from 1938 (2 caps)
First international: France-Belgium, 5–3, 30 January 1938
Picked for the 1938 World Cup (did not play)
Belgian Champion in 1938 and 1939 with Beerschot VAC

References

External links
 

1917 births
1996 deaths
Belgium international footballers
Belgian footballers
1938 FIFA World Cup players
K. Beerschot V.A.C. players
Standard Liège players
Belgian football managers
Beerschot A.C. managers
Footballers from Antwerp
Association football defenders